Harriet Tubman Underground Railroad State Park is a Maryland state park dedicated to the life and work of abolitionist and Underground Railroad activist Harriet Tubman. The park is on Route 335 near Church Creek in Dorchester County, adjacent to Blackwater National Wildlife Refuge.

History
The park was created in 2007 through a land swap with the U.S. Fish and Wildlife Service and developed in conjunction with the Harriet Tubman Underground Railroad National Historical Park. The park is the traihead for the  Harriet Tubman Underground Railroad Byway and All American Road. The Harriet Tubman Underground Railroad Visitor Center opened in the park on March 11, 2017.

References

External links
Harriet Tubman Underground Railroad State Park Maryland Department of Natural Resources
Harriet Tubman Underground Railroad Visitor Center Welcome Guide Maryland Park Service
Harriet Tubman Underground Railroad National Historical Park National Park Service

African-American history of Maryland
Harriet Tubman
Parks in Dorchester County, Maryland
State parks of Maryland
Underground Railroad locations
Memorials to Harriet Tubman
Protected areas established in 2007